Jack O'Halloran (born April 8, 1943) is an American actor and former boxer. O'Halloran fought in 57 professional boxing matches (including fights with future heavyweight champions George Foreman and Ken Norton), but he is best known for acting in such films as Superman, Superman II, Dagon: Troll World Chronicles and Dragnet.

Early life and boxing
O'Halloran was born in Philadelphia, and was raised by his mother, Mary, and stepfather, Peter Paul Patrick O'Halloran; in his book Family Legacy, he claimed to be the illegitimate son of mafia hitman and crime boss Albert Anastasia. He lived in Runnemede, New Jersey. Fighting as "Irish" Jack O'Halloran from Boston, he was a heavyweight boxing contender active from 1966 to 1974. The 6'6" O'Halloran was undefeated in his first 16 professional fights.

During his boxing career, O'Halloran defeated former title contenders Cleveland Williams and Manuel Ramos. He also defeated Danny McAlinden, who won a bronze medal in boxing at the 1966 British Empire and Commonwealth Games in Kingston, Jamaica and later became the British and Commonwealth Heavyweight Champion. O'Halloran's losses included defeats to Joe Roman (twice), Joe Bugner, Ron Lyle, and future heavyweight champions George Foreman and Ken Norton.

In 1973, O'Halloran was close to attaining a match against Muhammad Ali when he was knocked out by Jimmy Summerville. This ended his chances to fight Ali. Although O'Halloran went on to defeat Summerville by K.O. in a rematch, with only three more wins and five losses he was never again a serious heavyweight contender.

The California Boxing Hall of Fame has listed O'Halloran as one of its inductees of the 2009 HOF class.

Acting career
Retiring from boxing in 1974 with a record of 34-21-2 (17 knockout victories),  O'Halloran turned to a career as an actor. He first won the role of ex-convict Moose Malloy in the 1975 film Farewell, My Lovely, featuring Robert Mitchum as private eye Philip Marlowe.

After Farewell, My Lovely O'Halloran was offered other roles, some of which he turned down, including the role of Jaws in The Spy Who Loved Me which went to Richard Kiel.

Superman film series
He acquired other roles as tough henchmen which culminated in the role he is best known for, Non, the menacing but mute member of the trio of Kryptonian supervillains banished to the Phantom Zone by Jor-El (Marlon Brando) in Superman (1978) and inadvertently released by Superman in Superman II (1980).

O'Halloran once stated in an interview that it was his idea to make Non a childlike character, having difficulty adjusting to his newfound powers and making sounds in the absence of voice. O'Halloran criticized Alexander and Ilya Salkind, the producers of the Superman films, for their mishandling of the franchise, believing that their firing of director Donner was a huge blow to the series and the cause of its downturn in quality, a sentiment that was shared by Gene Hackman, who refused to reprise his Lex Luthor role in the third film, and by Margot Kidder who played Lois Lane.

In an interview with Starlog Magazine in 2006, O'Halloran stated that he and Christopher Reeve did not get along during the making of Superman II. On one occasion, he had Reeve against a wall, but Richard Donner intervened and dissuaded him from hitting Reeve. He later discussed this incident on the How Did This Get Made? podcast's Episode 24.1. Despite the clash between them, O'Halloran stated that his heart went out to Reeve after his 1995 accident, and commended him for helping others with spinal cord injuries.

Other acting roles
O'Halloran has also played supporting roles in King Kong (1976), March or Die (1977), The Baltimore Bullet (1980), Dragnet (1987), Hero and the Terror (1988), Mob Boss (1990), The Flintstones (1994) and Dagon Troll World Chronicles (2019).

Other ventures 
In 2008, O'Halloran announced plans to enter into a partnership with veteran Hollywood executive Jay Samit to create Long Beach Studios, a chain of film studio facilities throughout the United States.

In 2010, O'Halloran released Family Legacy. The book also outlines O'Halloran's relationship with his alleged father, a former boss of the Gambino crime family, Albert Anastasia.

Filmography
 1975 Farewell, My Lovely as "Moose" Malloy
 1976 King Kong as Joe Perko
 1977 March or Die as Ivan
 1978 Superman as Non
 1980 The Baltimore Bullet as Max
 1980 Superman II as Non
 1987 Dragnet as Emel Muzz
 1988 Hero and the Terror as Simon Moon
 1990 Mob Boss as Angelo
 1994 Huck and the King of Hearts as Truck
 1994 The Flintstones as Yeti
 2011 Superman: Requiem as Shuttle Commander (voice)
 2016 Enter the Fist and the Golden Fleece as FDA Super Agent
 2016 Abduct as Alistair
 2019 Dagon: Troll World Chronicles as Prime Minister

Professional boxing record

References

External links

 BoxRec.com 
 

1943 births
Living people
American male film actors
American male television actors
Heavyweight boxers
Boxers from Philadelphia
People from Runnemede, New Jersey
American male boxers
American people of Italian descent